Paris, the capital of France, has many of the country's most important libraries. The Bibliothèque nationale de France (BnF; in English "national library of France") operates public libraries in Paris, among them the François-Mitterrand, Richelieu, Louvois, Opéra, and Arsenal.

Overview
In the 2nd arrondissement, the Bibliothèque Richelieu is to a design by Henri Labrouste with nine domes; it opened in 1868. There are three public libraries in the 4th arrondissement. The Bibliothèque Forney, in the Le Marais district, is dedicated to the decorative arts; the Arsenal Library occupies a former military building, and has a large collection on French literature; and the Bibliothèque historique de la ville de Paris, also in Le Marais, contains the Paris historical research service. The Bibliothèque Sainte-Geneviève is in 5th arrondissement; designed by Henri Labrouste and built in the mid-1800s, it contains a rare book and manuscript division. The Human and Social Sciences Library Paris Descartes-CNRS is associated with the national public library as a mixed service unit in the Latin Quarter. Situated in the 6th arrondissement, Bibliothèque Mazarine is the oldest public library in France. The Médiathèque Musicale Mahler in the 8th arrondissement opened in 1986 and contains collections related to music. The Bibliothèque François-Mitterrand (nicknamed Très Grande Bibliothèque i.e. very large library; and part of the BnF) in the 13th arrondissement was completed in 1994 to a design of Dominique Perrault and contains four glass towers. In the same arrondissement, Bibliothèque Marguerite Durand opened in 1931 and holds a collection on feminism. The children's library, Petite Bibliothèque Ronde, opened in 1965.

There are several academic libraries and archives in Paris. The Bibliothèque de la Sorbonne in the 5th arrondissement is the largest university library in Paris. In addition to the Sorbonne location, there are branches in Malesherbes, Clignancourt-Championnet, Michelet-Institut d'Art et d'Archéologie, Serpente-Maison de la Recherche, and Institut des Etudes Ibériques. Situated in the 7th arrondissement, The American Library in Paris opened on 20 May 1920 and is part of a private, non-profit organisation. It originated from cases of books sent by the American Library Association to U.S. soldiers in France. Other academic libraries include Interuniversity Pharmaceutical Library, Leonardo da Vinci University Library, Paris School of Mines Library, and the René Descartes University Library.
Opened in 2009, the Bibliothèque Sainte-Barbe is an inter-university library located in the buildings of the former College of St. Barbara.

See also

References

External links